Seekers of the Sky is a series of two novels written by the popular Russian science fiction and fantasy writer Sergey Lukyanenko.  The two novels, Cold Shores and Morning Nears, are written as a mix of alternate history and fantasy genres.  They basically describe the same story broken in two.

The World
The point of divergence is described as the death of Jesus Christ during the Massacre of the Innocents, as Joseph was unable to keep him safe:

The Word gave the wielder the ability to miraculously put any object into the so-called Cold. The Cold is a pocket dimension with unknown topology. It is known that time does not flow in the Cold (e.g. a clock removed from the Cold will show the same time as when it was placed). It is impossible to place a living being into the Cold. The size and the number of objects a single person can place in the Cold differs for each individual. To place an object into the Cold, one must first touch it. Apparently, the Redeemer's Word had no restrictions (i.e. he could place any number of objects into the Cold without touching them).

Any person can learn the Word from someone who already knows it. Only the wielder of the Word and the person who taught him or her the Word has access to objects placed by the wielder into the Cold. Due to the latter fact, it is not unusual for a wielder of the Word to be tortured for it and then killed to guarantee that the new wielder's property remains untouched. If a person dies, then his or her stored property remained in the Cold forever (unless retrieved by that person's teacher).

The Word spread quickly among the people from the Redeemer's disciples.

Using the Word, the Redeemer became the ruler of the Roman Empire. He attempted to fulfill his mission, to use his imperial power to turn the people to the light. As expected, these attempts were futile, as the animal instincts were rooted too deeply in the people. In desperation, the Redeemer decided to make wars among men impossible. He took most of Earth's iron and put it into the Cold, after which he ordered his disciples to tie him to a wooden post, which he took with himself to the Cold.

The history of the world without iron followed a completely different path from ours. As the events of the novels take place "two thousand years after the Redeemer", the characters can be seen as contemporary. In this world, Europe is dominated by a single country, known simply as the State. It can be assumed that the State is the old Roman Empire, which managed to remain whole during the Migration Period. The State consists of the territory held by modern France, Netherlands, Spain, Italy, Yugoslavia (pre-1991 borders), Poland, Czech, Slovakia, Hungary, Germany, as well as its colonial holdings in the British Isles and the Americas. In the Balkans, the State borders the Ottoman Empire. To the North, after several vassal nations, it borders the Russian Khanate, a nation created by Genghis Khan after his conquest of the Rus' people. Beyond the Khanate, there exists the Chinese Empire (possibly split off from the Khanate, as it was also once conquered by the Mongols). The capital of the State is Lutecia (this reality's Paris). 

After two thousand years, the Word has gained widespread use. It is usually used in domestic environment (e.g. its wielders can store their luggage in the Cold). Also, the Word is used to protect the riches of the nobility, the clergy, the treasure of the Possessor (the ruler of the State) and much more.

The lack of iron has had a negative impact on the rate of scientific advancement. The citizens of the 21st century State still ride horses and stagecoaches and are just beginning to learn the practical use of electricity. Non-automatic firearms exist, but only elite military divisions and officers have the right to carry them. Most soldiers carry swords into battle, usually made from bronze. The State's air force is made up of wooden gliders, sometimes armed with bombs and equipped with primitive short-range rocket boosters. China is considered to be the most advanced nation on Earth. For example, Chinese gliders are capable of flying nonstop from China to Europe by using long-range boosters (nobody else has that technology).

The iron deficit had another effect on the world economy. The economy of all the nations on Earth is based on the iron standard, not gold standard. While gold is valuable, it is seen only as a decorative metal, while iron is both a currency and a good (iron is not only extremely rare but is also perishable). Several characters mention that the secret of "cheap iron mining" has been discovered twice in history. It is believed that the Britons knew the secret, but it was lost during the invasion of Britain by the State, with the British king taking the secret to his grave. Several ancient Chinese masters also, apparently, knew the secret. They were executed by Genghis Khan after he conquered China, as he believed that "true warriors need not hide behind shields".

There is a single government-sanctioned religion in the State; however, there are two religious institutions: the Church of the Redeemer, and the Church of the Sister (one of the Redeemer's disciples). Both have their top clergy members located in the city of Urbis (this world's name for the Vatican). Despite the two churches, there is just one head, equivalent to the Pope. He is known as God's Stepson, the same title as formerly held by the Redeemer. According to this world's religious history, out of the Redeemer's twelve disciples, eleven betrayed him, leaving Judas Iscariot the only faithful apostle. They were almost immediately replaced by eleven Roman soldiers. The twelfth soldier refused to acknowledge the Redeemer as anything but a man and a would-be emperor and is viewed by the people of this world with almost as much scorn as we view Judas.

The religion of the Redeemer has an interesting take on the "thou shalt not kill" commandment. Murder is not considered a deadly sin, unless the person is guilty of killing more than twelve people. There are exceptions to the rule, such as child-killers. This is all based on the literal interpretation of a phrase attributed to the Redeemer, "[they] can kill a dozen men and still be without guilt in my eyes." It is also noted that anyone may take another person's kill for themselves, thereby absolving the real killer of responsibility before God (the killer can still be legally prosecuted).

Other religions still exist, such as Judaism, Islam, and Buddhism. Many American tribes are still pagan. While there are several denominations on the religion of the Redeemer, only one is allowed in the State. One specific denomination is the Aquinism, which follows the teachings of Thomas Aquinas, who believed in the existence of the Devil. After being exiled from the State, the Aquinians emigrated to the Russian Khanate, which does not have such strict religious laws.

Main characters
 Ilmar the Slick: escaped convict, a thief. Usually desecrates graves and robs from abandoned places (e.g. ghost towns, lost cities). Deeply religious, devout follower of the Sister.
 Marcus: bastard son of the Possessor (official title: junior prince). Has no rights to the throne. Escapes from the palace; the Possessor wants him back at all costs.
 Helen the Night Witch: a duchess of the State. An ace combat glider pilot.
 Arnold: an officer of the Guard (the State's national security service).
 Jean of Baghdad: a baron of the State (only in title, as his supposed holdings lie beyond the State's borders). Served as the court medic. Delivered Marcus. Lives the life of a hermit.
 Sister Louisa: mother superior of a convent. Former lady of the court.
 Brother Jähns: a Dutch monk who broke his vow of celibacy and was punished by being assigned as the warden of an underground prison.
 Antoine of Lyon: a count of the State. A retired combat glider pilot. Helen's instructor. Writes poetry but refuses to publish his work.
 Bishop Gerard Lightbringer: ex-thief, now a bishop of the capital of the State. Known for performing healing wonders, using the Word. He is somehow able to put malignant cell into the Cold, which is a direct violation of one of the restrictions of the Word (nothing of the living can be taken with the Word) and is seen as a miracle.
 Peter: a young Magyar. His cancer was cured by Bishop Gerard. Extremely adept at languages, including Roman, Magyar, Gallic, Russian, Judaic, Ottoman, Germanic, and Iberian. Currently learning Chinese.
 Fahrid Komarov: a baron of the Russian Khanate and an intelligence agent.

Story

Cold Shores 
A renowned thief named Ilmar the Slick is captured and sent to a penal colony, sentenced to mine iron for the rest of his life on the Isles of Sorrow. On the prison ship, he meets a teenager named Mark. He soon discovers that Mark knows the Word and keeps a dagger on it, among other things. Using this knowledge, Ilmar comes up with an escape plan and puts it into motion when the ship arrives to its destination. However, they are unable to get off the island, as the local administration takes radical and over-the-top measures to catch the escapees, which makes Ilmar wonder what is really happening. Mark reveals that he is the reason, as he was sent to the mines by mistake; his true sins are much more serious (he refuses to explain further, although Ilmar realizes that the boy is of noble blood). Ilmar and Mark then sneak onto the island airstrip, as the only other way out is blocked by a State warship. They find only one glider on the strip. It belongs to Helen, who has brought a warrant for Mark's arrest to the island. Ilmar and Mark force Helen to fly them to the mainland. Helen does as she is told, but her glider crashes on landing. As both Ilmar and Helen are in worse condition than he is, Mark departs. However, before leaving, in return for rescuing him, Mark grants Ilmar the title of the Count of the Isles of Sorrow. After Mark's departure, Helen helps Ilmar recover by having sex with him (he is pretty much helpless at that point).

After his recovery, Ilmar secretly arrives to Amsterdam. There he finds wanted posters of him and Mark, whose real name is Marcus. Marcus is a junior prince of the House (official title of the Possessor's bastard children). Ilmar is discovered and nearly caught by officer Arnold, but the thief manages to escape and hide in a church. There he discovers that the Church of the Sister is carrying out a separate investigation and search for Marcus. Ilmar, as a valuable witness, is sent to Urbis (possibly, Rome) to meet with the head of the Church to give his statement. He is escorted out of the cordoned off city by a paladin. Unfortunately, their stagecoach is intercepted by a party of clerics (headed by another paladin) from the Church of the Redeemer, whose orders are to kill Ilmar and Marcus. In the ensuing fight, both paladins kill each other, and Ilmar manages to slip away.

Shortly after that, Ilmar accidentally encounters Jean, who recognizes Ilmar as the escaped thief, but lets him go, as he has fond memories of Marcus.

Some time later, Helen finds Ilmar. She explains what is happening. Apparently, shortly before his escape, Marcus stole an ancient (two thousand years old) book from a restricted church archive. The highly-bureaucratic administrators of the archive had no idea about the true value of the book, but informed the heads of the Church just the same. They immediately ordered the immediate recovery of the book, but Marcus has disappeared along with it. The value of the book is the reason why the entire nation is out to get Marcus. However, Helen does not know why the book is so valuable. After discussing their situation, Ilmar and Helen decide that their only chance for survival is to find Marcus and convince him to return the book. After some investigative work, they manage to find the boy, who was hiding in a female monastery as a nun. The mother superior of the monastery, Sister Louisa, is a former lady of the court and hid the boy, as she believes that it is the will of God.

Marcus and Sister Louisa meet with Ilmar and Helen. Marcus explains the true value of the book. The book was written by the Sister, one of the Redeemer's disciples, and contains in it the True Word. This information is extremely valuable, as the wielder of the True Word would have access to everything that anyone has ever placed into the Cold, including all the treasures of the world.

After learning this, Ilmar and Helen realize that simply giving Marcus up will not spare them, as they will be executed for fear of knowing the True Word. They decide to run and hide. However, officer Arnold manages to find them and attempts to detain Marcus. Then Marcus, as the Redeemer had done in his own time, performs a wonder by putting all the weapons of the guards, including Arnold's revolver, into the Cold without touching them. This convinces Arnold to help the escapees, as he believes that the Redeemer has finally returned.

Morning Nears
Ilmar, Helen, Sister Louisa, Arnold, and Marcus attempt to leave the State, but they are found. Ilmar stays behind to delay the pursuers. Ilmar is captured by the Church. The head of the Church (analogous to the Pope) interrogates him, after which the thief is thrown into the dungeon of Urbis. Despite this, Ilmar manages to escape, along with Brother Jähns.

They arrive to Jean's house, seeking his counsel on what they should do next. There they meet Antoine of Lyon. The four of them decide to search for Marcus together to find if he really is the next Redeemer or the Tempter (the Antichrist). They come to the conclusion that Marcus is going to attempt to reach Judea, the Holy Land. They split up into pairs: Jean with Brother Jähns and Ilmar with Antoine, and agree to meet at Aquincum. At a boarding house, Ilmar and Antoine encounter Bishop Gerard Lightbringer, who recognizes Ilmar. However, he also wants to find out which of the prophesied figures is Marcus, so he helps the escapees and joins their quest.

In Aquincum, Bishop Gerard cures a Magyar boy named Peter, who wants to help the trio search for Marcus. While he initially does not know who exactly they are searching for, he soon manages to figure it out. During Bishop Gerard's stay in Aquincum, Baron Fahrid Komarov of the Russian Khanate asks him for an audience. While he claims to be a traveler and a négociant, in reality, he is a Russian spy, as his government has their own interest in Marcus.

Eventually, Ilmar and Antoine locate Marcus and his companions. Together, they try to leave Aquincum, but the State's army surrounds the city. With Komarov's help, they use tunnels to escape the city and the State into the Ottoman Empire. There, they finally meet Jean and Jähns. Realizing where Marcus has escaped to, the State and the Khanate both demand that the Ottomans capture and extradite the escapees. However, the escapees make their way to an air field and capture two gliders, which they use to get to Judea.

The State and the Khanate wish to capture Marcus and the True Word at any cost. They send their elite forces to Judea: the State sends the Grey Vests, an elite praetorian legion, while the Khanate sends the Semetskiy guard regiment. They chase the escapees to the top of Tel Megiddo, but, at the last moment, there is a conflict of interest between the two forces. The Grey Vests and the Semetskiy regiment are almost at each other's throats. However, before they can kill each other, Marcus, who has reached his full potential at the top of the hill, performs the greatest wonder of them all by pulling everything that has ever been stored in the Cold for the last two thousand years.

Everyone rejoice and praise Marcus as the new Redeemer, but Ilmar understands that they are wrong: Marcus won't become the savior and won't redeem anything. Just like the original Redeemer, he won't show any new ways to the humanity, he'll merely become the new world ruler, while people will remain the same. 

While his friends are about to make journey to Rome for Marcus to be crowned, Ilmar leaves them to their fate and decides to seek his own path in the new world.

Trivia
 Certain qualities or details of several characters allow them to be compared with real-life people, who led different lives in the other world. The flier Antoine can be compared to Antoine de Saint Exupéry, officer Arnold is a duplicate of Arnold Schwarzenegger, and Bishop Gerard is an alternate Gérard Depardieu.
 The name of the Russian elite regiment is a popular trope among modern Russian science fiction writers of "killing Semetskiy" in their books, a popular book publisher.

References

Novels by Sergey Lukyanenko
1999 novels
2000 novels
Russian fantasy novels
Russian alternate history novels
20th-century Russian novels